Ditlev Conrad Blunck (22 June 1798 – 7 January 1853) was a Danish-German painter associated with the Danish Golden Age during the first half of the 19th century.

Biography

Blunck was born in 1798 in Münsterdorf in Holstein, at that time a duchy with a largely German-speaking populace ruled by Denmark. In 1814 he began his studies at the Royal Danish Academy of Art in Copenhagen as a student of C.A. Lorentzen and C.W. Eckersberg.  He was trained concurrently with fellow students Wilhelm Bendz, Ernst Meyer, and Albert Küchler. Presumably dissatisfied with the Danish Academy, Blunck moved in 1818 to Munich and enrolled at the Royal Academy of Fine Arts. He studied in Bavaria for two years before returning to Copenhagen.

Back in Denmark, Blunck became a student of the recently appointed J. L. Lund, a Romantic historical painter who was to become a major influence on his development. Thus, it was also mostly history painting that marked Blunck's early work. Later, through genre painting, Blunck became representative of the kind of everyday realism that was to appear in Danish art in the mid-1820s.

Lund's influence grew particularly clear during Blunck's stay in Germany beginning in 1828. In Berlin, Munich, and Dresden, he became acquainted with Lund's artist-friends, including the famed Romantic painter Caspar David Friedrich. He was, however, more influenced by the works of Johann Friedrich Overbeck in changing his artistic direction. Blunck began to devote himself to religious motifs and developed a painting style that was strongly influenced by the Nazarene movement, unusual among Danish painters.

Blunck's sojourns abroad also brought him repeatedly to Rome. Here, he joined the group of Danish artists around Bertel Thorvaldsen and produced several of his major paintings, including Danish Artists in the Roman Inn La Gensola (1837).

In 1841, he was expelled from Denmark due to homosexual acts. As a result, he left the country, and he even took up arms against Denmark in the First Schleswig War (1848-1852). Despite being persona non grata in Denmark, he was commissioned by King Christian VIII of Denmark to paint the four-part cycle "The Ages of Man" for the Royal Painting Collection.

Works

Bibliography
 Ulrich Schulte-Wülwer: Malerei in Schleswig-Holstein. Katalog der Gemäldesammlung des Städtischen Museums Flensburg, Boyens, Heide 1989,

See also

 Art of Denmark

References

1798 births
1853 deaths
19th-century Danish painters
19th-century German painters
Danish male painters
German male painters
Danish LGBT artists
German LGBT painters
German gay artists
Gay painters
People from Steinburg
Royal Danish Academy of Fine Arts alumni
19th-century German male artists
19th-century Danish male artists